Philippa Rachel "Pippa" Funnell MBE (née Nolan, 7 October 1968) is an equestrian sportswoman who competes in eventing. In 2003, she became the first person to win the Rolex Grand Slam of Eventing (consecutive wins at Rolex Kentucky, Badminton and Burghley). She also won Badminton in 2002 and 2005. At the European Championships, she has won two Individual golds (1999–2001) and three team golds (1999–2003). She is a three-time Olympic medallist, winning team silver in 2000 and 2004, and an individual bronze in 2004. She also competed at the 2016 Summer Olympics.

Early and personal life
Pippa Funnell was born in Crowborough, East Sussex on 7 October 1968 to Jenny and George Nolan. She grew up in Mark Cross and went to the Mark Cross CE primary school. She attended the independent boarding school Wadhurst College on Mayfield Lane in Wadhurst. Aged 16, she persuaded her parents to allow her to leave school, after which she based herself with Ruth McMullin.

Funnell married her husband, show jumper William Funnell in December 1993. They live in Ockley in Surrey where they have a stud farm to breed horses. They became the first husband and wife to be inducted into The British Horse Society Equestrian Hall of Fame when William was inducted in 2014. Pippa had been inducted in 2005.

Career
Her horses have included Supreme Rock, Primmore's Pride, Sir Barnaby, Bits and Pieces, Walk on Star, and Ensign.

Funnell was European Young Rider Champion in 1987 after successfully competing on Sir Barnaby at Bialy Bor, Poland. Despite a successful career as a junior and young rider, she at first struggled to establish herself as a senior international and by her own admission suffered from nerves that were threatening to ruin her career. She began receiving help from sports psychologist Nicky Heath.

In 1999, Funnell became European Champion at Luhmühlen riding Supreme Rock and again on the same horse in 2001 at Pau ("Les Etoiles de Pau" – France). She was a member of the British teams that won silver at the Sydney Olympics in 2000, bronze at the World Equestrian Games in 2002 both with Supreme Rock, and silver again at the Athens Olympics of 2004, this time with Primmore`s Pride. In addition, Funnell won the individual bronze medal at Athens. (She competed at the Athens Olympics as 'Philippa' rather than 'Pippa' as 'Pipa' in Greek is slang for a sexual act.)

In 2003, Funnell became the first rider ever to complete the Rolex Grand Slam of Eventing, by adding the Burghley title to her victories earlier in the year at Kentucky and Badminton, to earn a $250,000 bonus from Rolex. The Kentucky and Burghley victories were on Primmore's Pride, while the Badminton victory was on Supreme Rock. As of 2017, she remains one of only two riders to have won the Grand Slam. As a result of her achievements, she was voted Sunday Times Sportswoman of the Year 2003 and was in the top five of the BBC Sports Personality of the Year Awards. She then went to Punchestown in Ireland to defend the individual European title that she had won in 1999 and 2001, winning a bronze medal with the inexperienced Walk On Star and helping the British team to win their fifth successive team title. She also finished the year as the number one ranked rider in the world.

In total Funnell has won the Badminton Horse Trials three times: 2002, 2003 and 2005. She has won both the Blenheim venue and Windsor Horse Trials four times as well, the only rider yet to do so. With Funnell as rider, Primmore's Pride became the 1st horse to win all three major four star titles - Kentucky & Burghley in 2003 and Badminton in 2005 - thus becoming the 1st horse to win its own Grand Slam.

After winning Badminton in 2005, Funnell did not win an international event for five years.  Several of her top horses, such as Supreme Rock, Primmore’s Pride, Viceroy, Walk on Star, Cornerman and Jurassic Rising reached the end of their careers and were retired. With Ensign, she finished ninth at the 2005 Europeans. The combination were placed on the shortlist for the 2008 Olympics following a 2nd place at Pau CCI**** in late 2007. A fall at Badminton in 2008 put paid to them being picked.

In 2010, Funnell won her first international event for five years in the CCI3* at Bramham International horse trials on her upcoming horse Redesigned. They went on to finish 5th as an individual at the 2010 World Equestrian Games. In 2011, she won Barbary CIC3* on Billy Llandretti. In 2013, she won Tattersalls CCI3* with another upcoming horse, Billy Beware, who finished 6th at his first 4* event at Badminton Horse Trials 2014. This pairing were picked for the 2014 World Equestrian Games but injury unfortunately ruled them out. In May 2015, she won her third Chatsworth CIC 3* title aboard Sandman7. On 13 September 2015, Funnell won her 1st European team medal in 12 years helping GB win Team Silver at Blair Castle aboard Sandman 7. Since 2010, her horses have included Redesigned, Billy Beware, Billy the Biz, Billy Llandretti, Mirage D`Elle, Billy Cuckoo and Sandman7.

At the Rio 2016 Summer Olympics, riding Billy the Biz, Funnell was part of the British team that finished fifth. Her individual placement was 26th.

Funnell won the 2019 Burghley Horse Trials, riding MGH Grafton Street, having led from day one.

CCI 5* Results

International Championship results

Honours 

Funnell was made an MBE in the Queen's 2005 Birthday Honours for services to equestrian sport.

Media activities and writing 
Funnell has appeared on DVDs produced by Equestrian Vision, including Pippa Funnell, Road to the Top and The Funnell Factor, and in 2005 wrote her story in Pippa Funnell: The Autobiography.

Ubisoft has released a series of horse-themed videogames starring Funnell. These include Pippa Funnell for the Nintendo DS and Game Boy Advance, Pippa Funnell: Stable Adventure for the Game Boy Advance, and the PC games Pippa Funnell: The Stud Farm Inheritance, Pippa Funnell: Take the Reins (also for PlayStation 2), Pippa Funnell 3: The Golden Stirrups Challenge (more commonly known as Horsez), and Pippa Funnell 4: Secrets of the Ranch. Pippa Funnell: Ranch Rescue was released in 2007 on the PlayStation 2 and Nintendo Wii.

Funnell is also the author of a series of children's books called Tilly's Pony Tails, published by Orion Children’s Books in the United Kingdom. The first two books in the series, Magic Spirit and Red Admiral were first published in May 2009. The series has now been extended to eighteen titles in all. The first four titles have also been recorded as unabridged audiobooks, read by sports presenter Clare Balding. The central character, Tilly Redbrow, is an adopted child, who is passionate about everything to do with horses and ponies. Each title in the series tells a new story about Tilly’s adventures with horses and ponies. As well as the fictional story, each title also contains a tips section with expert advice from Funnell on all aspects of horses and ponies.

Books

 Magic Spirit: the dream horse (2009) 
 Red Admiral: the racehorse (2009) 
 Rosie: the perfect pony (2009) 
 Samson: the stallion (2009) 
 Lucky Chance: the new foal (2009) 
 Solo: the super star (2010) 
 Pride and Joy: the event horse (2010) 
 Neptune: the heroic horse (2010) 
 Parkview Pickle: the naughty show pony (2010) 
 Nimrod: the circus pony (2010) 
 Moonshadow: the Derby winner (2011) 
 Autumn Glory: the new horse (2011) 
 Goliath: the rescue horse (2011) 
 Buttons: the naughty pony (2011) 
 Rusty: the trustworthy pony (2011) 
 Royal Flame: the police horse (2011) 
 Stripy: the zebra foal (2012) 
 Free Spirit: the mustang (2012)

Audiobooks, read by Clare Balding

 Magic Spirit (2010) 
 Red Admiral (2010) 
 Rosie (2010) 
 Samson (2010)

Special editions
Tilly's Horse box (2010) 
Tilly's Pony Tails 1–3 (2010) 
Tilly's Pony Tails Annual 2011 (2010) 

Other booksPippa Funnell: The Autobiography (2005) 
 Ask Pippa (Questions and Answers)'' (2010)

References

External links 
 Pippa Funnell's complete competition records
 Brief biography
 Series website for Tilly's Pony Tails
 Books by Pippa Funnell on the Orion Publishing Group website

British event riders
Equestrians at the 2000 Summer Olympics
Equestrians at the 2004 Summer Olympics
Equestrians at the 2016 Summer Olympics
Olympic equestrians of Great Britain
Olympic silver medallists for Great Britain
Olympic bronze medallists for Great Britain
Members of the Order of the British Empire
1968 births
Living people
People from Crowborough
Olympic medalists in equestrian
Medalists at the 2004 Summer Olympics
British female equestrians
Medalists at the 2000 Summer Olympics
The Sunday Times Sportswoman of the Year winners
People from Rotherfield